The House of Lamberg is the name of an ancient Austrian noble family, whose members occupied significant positions within Holy Roman Empire and later in the Austro-Hungarian Empire.

History 
The family name first appeared in the 14th century in Carinthia, Austria. They were created Barons in the 16th century, Imperial Counts in 17th century and later Princes of the Holy Roman Empire in the 18th century.

Notable members of the family were 
Johann Maximilian von Lamberg (1608-1682), Obersthofmeister and diplomat
Anna Aloysia Maximiliane von Lamberg (died 1738), Austrian countess 
Count Franz Philipp von Lamberg (1791–1848), Austrian general
Johann Philipp von Lamberg (1651–1712), Bishop of Passau and diplomat
Anton Franz de Paula Graf Lamberg-Sprinzenstein (1740–1822), Austrian diplomat

It may also refer to people, not related to the noble House of Lamberg 

Adam Lamberg (born 1984), American actor
Matti Lamberg (born 1993), Finnish ice hockey player
Saara Lamberg (born 1986), Finnish actress 
Karin Lamberg-Skog (born 1961), Swedish skier
Lambert (name)
Lomberg

See also

 
Germanic-language surnames